The following highways are numbered 177:

Canada
 New Brunswick Route 177
 Prince Edward Island Route 177

Costa Rica
 National Route 177

Ireland
 R177 road (Ireland)

Japan
 Japan National Route 177

United States
 U.S. Route 177
 Alabama State Route 177
 Arizona State Route 177
 Arkansas Highway 177
 California State Route 177
 Colorado State Highway 177
 Connecticut Route 177
 Florida State Road 177 (former)
 Georgia State Route 177
 Illinois Route 177
 K-177 (Kansas highway)
 Kentucky Route 177
 Louisiana Highway 177
 Maine State Route 177
 Maryland Route 177
 Massachusetts Route 177
 M-177 (Michigan highway) (former)
 Missouri Route 177
 New Jersey Route 177 (former)
 New Mexico State Road 177
 New York State Route 177
 North Carolina Highway 177
 Ohio State Route 177
 Pennsylvania Route 177
 Rhode Island Route 177
 South Carolina Highway 177
 Tennessee State Route 177
 Texas State Highway 177 (former)
 Texas State Highway Loop 177
 Farm to Market Road 177 (Texas)
 Utah State Route 177 (former)
 Virginia State Route 177
 Wisconsin Highway 177 (former)

Territories:
 Puerto Rico Highway 177